Returning is a compilation album by William Ackerman, released in September 2004 through the record label Decca. In 2005, the album earned Ackerman the Grammy Award for Best New Age Album.

Track listing
 "The Bricklayer's Beautiful Daughter" - 4:18
 "Anne's Song" - 3:56
 "The Impending Death of the Virgin Spirit" - 6:16
 "Pictures" - 5:09
 "Hawk Circle" - 5:06
 "Barbara's Song" - 5:06
 "Unconditional" - 2:36
 "Visiting" - 5:46
 "Processional" - 5:00
 "In a Region of Clouds" - 4:22
 "Last Day at the Beach" - 5:04

Personnel
William Ackerman – composition, acoustic guitar, liner notes, production
Penny Bennett – art direction
Micaela Boland – cover design
Laura A. A. Johnson – package coordination
Bob Ludwig – mastering
Corin Nelsen – engineering, production
Chris Roberts – executive production
Thanne Tangel – package coordination
Irene Young – photography

References

2004 compilation albums
Albums produced by William Ackerman
Chamber jazz albums
Decca Records compilation albums
Grammy Award for Best New Age Album
William Ackerman albums